Norfolk Southern Passenger Station is a historic train station located at Elizabeth City, Pasquotank County, North Carolina. It was built in 1914 by the Norfolk Southern Railway, and is a long one-story brick building with eclectic Mission Revival style design elements.  It measures 98 feet by 36 feet, with a small projecting control booth.  It is topped by a tall hipped roof sheathed in clay tile.  Passenger service at Elizabeth City ceased in early 1948, and the building subsequently housed a variety of commercial businesses.

It was listed on the National Register of Historic Places in 1994.

References

Railway stations on the National Register of Historic Places in North Carolina
Mission Revival architecture in North Carolina
Railway stations in the United States opened in 1914
Norfolk Southern Railway
National Register of Historic Places in Pasquotank County, North Carolina
Former railway stations in North Carolina